Head over Heels is the second studio album by Scottish alternative rock band Cocteau Twins. The album was released on 24 October 1983 through the label 4AD. It featured the band's signature sound of "Guthrie’s lush guitars under Fraser’s mostly wordless vocals" and is considered an archetype of early ethereal wave music.

Music
Ned Raggett in The Guardian wrote that Fraser's singing was more direct in the mix than it had been on the band's first album, Garlands, and although her lyrics were still often understandable, she "began to shift away from conventional vocabulary towards enigmatic, emotional sound" on Head Over Heels. Writing for The Quietus, journalist Julian Marszalek said that with this album, "Fraser’s voice became just as much an instrument" as those played by her musicians", including Guthrie's "multi-layered and heavily reverberated guitars". He also remarked: "'In Our Angelhood' probably fits the bill best and it's a track that wouldn’t have sounded out of place on Siouxsie and the Banshees' Kaleidoscope". "The Tinderbox (Of a Heart)" conveys a sense of menace and danger, while the closing track "Musette and Drums" features sweeping guitars and chimes. Cam Lindsay of Exclaim! wrote that ""Multifoiled" has a phlegmatic rockabilly lean to it, "In Our Angelhood" is both post-punk and proto-shoegaze, and the dizzying "Sugar Hiccup" could singlehandedly be the conception of dream pop."

Release and reception

Head over Heels was released on 24 October 1983 by 4AD. The original United Kingdom and Canadian cassette and CD of Head over Heels, and the Brazilian CD versions, also  included the Sunburst and Snowblind EP. The 2003 CD, remastered by Guthrie, did not include the EP.

The album was well-received by John Peel, who played the entire record on his radio show.

Head over Heels was ranked at No. 7 in Sounds magazine's End of Year List for 1983.

In 2003, the album was named one of the most eccentric British albums of all time by Mojo magazine.

In March 2018, the album was repressed on 180g vinyl using new masters created from high definition files transferred from the original analogue tapes.

In popular culture

The song "Sugar Hiccup" was played during the end titles of the fifth episode of series five titled "Doughnuts", of Scottish sitcom Two Doors Down in July 2022.

Track listing

Personnel 
Cocteau Twins
Elizabeth Fraser – vocals
Robin Guthrie – guitar, bass guitar, keyboards, drum machine

Additional personnel
 Jon Turner – engineering
 23 Envelope – sleeve art design
 Ally Gibb - saxophone on "Five Ten Fiftyfold" (is thanked in credits as "Ally")

Charts

References

External links 

 

Cocteau Twins albums
Dark wave albums
1983 albums
4AD albums
Albums produced by John Fryer (producer)